Hovsepavan is a village de facto in the Askeran Province of the breakaway Republic of Artsakh, de jure in the Khojaly District of Azerbaijan, in the disputed region of Nagorno-Karabakh.

History 
Hovsepavan was founded during the period of the Karabakh movement in Nagorno-Karabakh. During the Soviet period, the area around the village was a part of the Askeran District of the Nagorno-Karabakh Autonomous Oblast.

After the 2020 Nagorno-Karabakh war, Artsakh launched the construction of a new residential area for 92 displaced families in the village.

Geography 
Hovsepavan is situated on the flatlands, 9 km to the west of Askeran, the regional centre, and 15 km to the north of Stepanakert, the capital of Artsakh.

Economy and culture 
The population of the village is mostly engaged in agriculture and animal husbandry, with the majority of the village lands being agricultural. As of 2015, the village has a municipal building, a house of culture, a school, and a medical centre.

Demographics 
The village has an ethnic Armenian-majority population, had 128 inhabitants in 2005, and 176 inhabitants in 2015.

References

External links 
 

Populated places in Askeran Province
Populated places in Khojaly District